Ambrosia is an American variety of fruit salad originating in the Southern United States. Most ambrosia recipes contain canned (often sweetened) or fresh pineapple, canned mandarin orange slices or fresh orange sections, miniature marshmallows, and coconut. Other ingredients might include various fruits and nuts: maraschino cherries, bananas, strawberries, peeled grapes, or crushed pecans. Ambrosia can also include mayonnaise or dairy ingredients: whipped cream (or whipped topping), sour cream, cream cheese, pudding, yogurt, or cottage cheese.

The mixture of ingredients is refrigerated for a few hours or overnight before serving to allow the flavors to meld.

In New Zealand, ambrosia refers to a similar dish made with whipped cream, yoghurt, fresh, canned or frozen berries, and chocolate chips loosely combined into a pudding.

The earliest known mention of the salad is in the 1867 cookbook Dixie Cookery by Maria Massey Barringer. The name references the food of the Greek gods.

See also
 Jello salad
 List of salads

References

External links
 
 

American desserts
Cuisine of the Southern United States
Fruit salads
Marshmallows
Foods containing coconut
American salads
Sweet salads